This is a list of the National Register of Historic Places listings in Bristol Bay Borough, Alaska.

This is intended to be a complete list of the properties and districts on the National Register of Historic Places in Bristol Bay Borough, Alaska, United States.  The locations of National Register properties and districts for which the latitude and longitude coordinates are included below, may be seen in an online map.

There are 3 properties listed on the National Register in the borough.

Current listings

|}

See also

 List of National Historic Landmarks in Alaska
 National Register of Historic Places listings in Alaska

References

 
Bristol Bay
Buildings and structures in Bristol Bay Borough, Alaska